Parthenolecanium is a genus of true bugs belonging to the family Coccidae.

The species of this genus are found in Europe, Australia and Northern America.

Species:
 Parthenolecanium cerasifex (Fitch, 1857) 
 Parthenolecanium fletcheri (Cockerell, 1893)

References

Coccidae